Lonnie R. Moore (13 July 1920 – 10 January 1956) was a United States military aviator who flew 54 combat missions in Martin B-26 Marauders during World War II, and whom became a double jet ace during the Korean War, downing ten MiG-15s and one probable while flying North American F-86 Sabres. He was killed in the crash of a new fighter type at Eglin AFB, Florida, at age 35.

Biography
Lonnie Raymond Moore was a native of Groesbeck and San Antonio, Texas, the son of Joseph Benjamin (J. B.) and Lillie Toten Moore of that city.

During World War II, Moore piloted B-26 Marauder medium bombers of the 596th Bomb Squadron (Medium), 397th Bomb Group (Medium), in the European Theatre of Operations, flying 54 missions, and being downed twice. In both cases, he evaded capture to return to duty. On 2 December 1944, Moore and his crew bailed out of B-26G-5-MA, 43-34290, over Nogent sur Vernisson, France, after an engine caught fire.
 
In the post-war era, he transitioned to fighter aircraft. As a captain, he was assigned to the Air Proving Ground Command at Eglin AFB, Florida, in 1951, where he served as a project officer during the Korean War, deploying TDY to Korea to perform a test under combat conditions with the 335th Fighter-Interceptor Squadron, 4th Fighter-Interceptor Wing in the modified F-86F-2 Sabre, upgunned with the M39 cannon. During the test mission he downed two MiG-15s with the new weapon. Remaining in Korea after the test was completed, he flew 100 combat missions, destroying ten MiGs, plus one probable. On 30 April 1953, on his 54th mission, Moore was forced to bail out of disabled F-86F-2, 51–2803, due to an engine stall following cannon-firing, approximately 20 miles north of Ch'o Do Island, coming down in the Yellow Sea. He was plucked from the water as soon as he got out of his parachute harness by a YH-19 helicopter of the 3d Air Rescue Squadron that had monitored his descent.

Moore scored his fifth aerial victory on 18 June 1953. 

Returning to Eglin by the last quarter of 1953, Moore was one of seven fighter pilots "who made exceptional records in Korea" profiled by Collier's Magazine in the October issue. Moore served as the Air Force Operational Test Center's chief project officer for operational suitability tests of the Air Force's first supersonic jet fighter, the F-100A Super Sabre, in 1954, and the F-100C, from October 1955, on which test program Moore served as senior project officer, from April 1955.

Death
On 10 January 1956, Moore was killed in the take-off crash of an F-101A-15-MC Voodoo, 53-2443, from Eglin AFB. Moore was making his first flight in the new fighter design but the jet pitched up and crashed in the center of the airfield just after becoming airborne, appearing to explode on impact. Although the crash site was only  from the fire station, and the blaze extinguished within three minutes, the pilot had no chance to escape and was killed. He was survived by his widow, the former Billie Geneva Hall, (also reported as Billie Geneeva Hall) of Dallas, Texas, and five children, Robert Barnes, 15; Barbara W., 13; Lonnie R. Jr., 7; Tina Gail, 3 1/2 and Steven Scott, 20 months old. Moore had been a resident of Fort Walton Beach, Florida for five years. He is buried at Fort Sam Houston National Cemetery.

At the time of his death, Moore had more than 1,500 hours in single-engine jet aircraft and 3,570 total flight hours, 328 of them in combat.

Honors and awards
Moore held 14 decorations, including the Nation's second highest award, the Distinguished Service Cross, plus the Silver Star, the Distinguished Flying Cross with two oak clusters, the Bronze Star and the Air Medal with 14 clusters.

References

External links
 Memorial site to Lonnie Moore created by his son, Steven

1920 births
1956 deaths
Accidental deaths in Florida
American Korean War flying aces
American test pilots
Aviators from Texas
Aviators killed in aviation accidents or incidents in the United States
Recipients of the Distinguished Service Cross (United States)
Recipients of the Air Medal
Recipients of the Silver Star
Recipients of the Distinguished Flying Cross (United States)
United States Air Force officers
United States Army Air Forces pilots of World War II
United States Army Air Forces officers
Victims of aviation accidents or incidents in 1956
People from Groesbeck, Texas
Military personnel from Texas
Burials at Fort Sam Houston National Cemetery
Shot-down aviators